Martinsson is a surname. Notable people with the surname include:

Barbro Martinsson (born 1935), former Swedish cross-country skier
Emil Martinsson (born 1979), Swedish sport shooter
Eric Martinsson (born 1992), Swedish professional ice hockey defenceman
Fridolf Martinsson, Swedish footballer
Gunnar Martinsson, Swedish footballer
Mikael Martinsson (born 1966), Swedish former footballer
Mikael Martinsson (ski jumper) (born 1968), Swedish former ski jumper
Örjan Martinsson (1936–1997), Swedish footballer
Rebecka Martinsson, fictional heroine in novels by Åsa Larsson (born 1966), a Swedish crime-fiction writer
Roland Poirier Martinsson (born 1962), author, conservative philosopher and broadcaster from Sweden, now living in Austin, Texas
Rolf Martinsson (born 1956), Swedish composer
Sven Martinsson (born 1935), retired Swedish bobsledder
Tony Martinsson (born 1966), former footballer and coach
Serge-Junior Martinsson Ngouali (born 1992), Gabonese footballer

See also
Martinson
Marteinsson
Martin Olsson

Swedish-language surnames
Patronymic surnames
Surnames from given names